Five ships of the Royal Navy have borne the name HMS Shearwater after the shearwater, a seabird:

  was a 10-gun  launched in 1808 and sold in 1832.
  was a wooden paddle packet launched in 1826 as the GPO vessel Dolphin. She was transferred to the Royal Navy and renamed in 1837, and was sold in 1857.
  was a  wooden screw sloop launched in 1861 and broken up by 1877.
  was a  launched in 1900. She was transferred to the Royal Canadian Navy as a depot ship in 1915 and was sold in 1922.
  was a  launched in 1939 and sold in 1947.

Royal Navy ship names